Acanthobrama thisbeae is a species of freshwater cyprinid fish, which is endemic to  Turkey.

References

thisbeae
Fish described in 2014